Chad Stevens Cascadden (born May 14, 1972) is a former professional American football player who played linebacker from 1995-1999 for the New York Jets.
Chad graduated from Chippewa Falls Senior High School in Chippewa Falls Wisconsin and has a BS in Kinesiology from the University of Wisconsin-Madison.

External links
Bio from 1999 Jets yearbook
Patriots bio

1972 births
Living people
People from Two Rivers, Wisconsin
Players of American football from Wisconsin
American football linebackers
Wisconsin Badgers football players
New York Jets players
New England Patriots players